Udomsilp Sornbutnark (born 1 June 1948) is a Thai former footballer who competed in the 1968 Summer Olympics.

References

External links
 

1948 births
Living people
Udomsilp Sornbutnark
Udomsilp Sornbutnark
Footballers at the 1968 Summer Olympics
Association football forwards
Udomsilp Sornbutnark